is a former Japanese football player.

Club career
Nakazawa was born in Mitaka on 26 October 1982. After graduating from high school, he joined Kashiwa Reysol in 2001. However he could hardly play in the match. He moved to FC Tokyo in June 2006. He moved to Gamba Osaka in 2007. He became a regular player from 2008. In 2008, the club won the champions AFC Champions League and the 3rd place Club World Cup. The club also won 2008 and 2009 Emperor's Cup. In late 2012, he could not play for injury and the club was relegated to J2 League. He moved to Kawasaki Frontale in 2013 and Cerezo Osaka in 2015. However his opportunity to play decreased and he retired end of 2016 season.

National team career
In June 2001, Nakazawa was selected Japan U-20 national team for 2001 World Youth Championship. At this tournament, he played all three matches.

Club statistics

Club World Cup statistics

Team honors
AFC Champions League – 2008
Pan-Pacific Championship – 2008
Emperor's Cup – 2008, 2009
J.League Cup – 2007
Japanese Super Cup – 2007

Youth National Team career
AFC Youth Championship : 2000
FIFA World Youth Championship : 2001

References

External links

Sota Nakazawa Official Blog

1982 births
Living people
People from Mitaka, Tokyo
Association football people from Tokyo Metropolis
Japanese footballers
Japan youth international footballers
J1 League players
J2 League players
Kashiwa Reysol players
FC Tokyo players
Gamba Osaka players
Kawasaki Frontale players
Cerezo Osaka players
Association football defenders